Huggett is a surname. Notable people with the surname include:

Alf Huggett (1892–1972), Australian rules footballer
Anne Huggett, activist for women
Arthur Huggett (1861–1945), English cricketer
Arthur St George Huggett 1897–1968, British physiologist
Brian Huggett (born 1936), Welsh professional golfer
Catherine Huggett, OAM (1970–2011), Australian Paralympic swimmer who won two medals at two Paralympics
Chris Huggett, engineer/designer, co-founded Electronic Dream Plant (EDP), founded Oxford Synthesiser Company
Maurice Huggett (1945–2011), proprietor of the Phoenix Artist Club in Soho, London
Monica Huggett (born 1953), British conductor and leading Baroque violinist
Ralf Huggett or Ralf Hogge, English iron-master and gun founder to the king, cast the first iron cannon in England, in 1543
Richard Huggett, British citizen who stood in a variety of elections using descriptions similar to established political parties
Richard Huggett (playwright) (1929–2000), British playwright
Sandra Huggett (born 1973), British actress
Stuart Huggett, British-born Fijian architect, businessman, and civil servant
Susan Huggett (born 1954), former field hockey player from Zimbabwe

See also
Huggett, Alberta, Leduc County, Alberta
The Huggetts (film series), three 1940s British films about the fictional Huggett family
Hogget (disambiguation)
Huguet
Huguette, feminine French given name